Curuzú Cuatiá Airport  is an airport serving Curuzú Cuatiá, Corrientes, Argentina.

See also

List of airports in Argentina

References

External links

Airports in Argentina